Arnie is an American television sitcom that ran for two seasons (1970–72) on CBS. It starred Herschel Bernardi, Sue Ane Langdon, and Roger Bowen.

Bernardi played the title character, Arnie Nuvo, a longtime blue collar employee at the fictitious Continental Flange Company, who overnight was promoted to an executive position. The story lines mainly focused on this fish-out-of-water situation, and on Arnie's sometimes-problematic relationship with his well-meaning but wealthy and eccentric boss, Hamilton Majors Jr. (Bowen). Because he still held his union card, Arnie could negotiate tricky management/labor situations that no one else could. Arnie's surname was presumably a pun on nouveau riche (which his promotion effectively made him), and possibly also on Art Nouveau.

In addition to Bernardi, Bowen, and Langdon (as Arnie's wife Lilian), cast members included Del Russel and Stephanie Steele as Arnie's son and daughter, Richard and Andrea; Elaine Shore as Arnie's secretary, Felicia; Herb Voland as sour-tempered vice-president Neil Ogilvie, and Tom Pedi as Arnie's loading dock friend, Julius. Olan Soule appeared occasionally as Fred Springer, another vice-president.

In its first season, despite being the lead-in to The Mary Tyler Moore Show on Saturday nights and winning an Emmy nomination as best comedy series, Arnie received only fair Nielsen ratings. For its second season, in order to increase its viewership, CBS made a major cast change in the show's format. Dick Van Patten was dropped as the Nuvos' next door neighbor, and Charles Nelson Reilly joined the cast as Randy Robinson, a TV chef who called himself "The Giddyap Gourmet", apparently a reference to The Galloping Gourmet.

Also, the network decided to move the show to Monday nights at 10:00 P.M. followed at 10:30 P.M. by a new sitcom that had debuted in January, 1971 on Tuesday nights to mediocre ratings, All In the Family. At the last minute, a switch was made and My Three Sons left its comfortable Saturday night time slot and took over the 10:00 P.M. slot on Mondays with Arnie slotted at 10:30 P.M. Both shows sank in the ratings. All In the Family was moved to Saturday nights at 8:00 P.M. where it became the number one show for five consecutive years. At mid-season, My Three Sons was moved to Thursday nights and Arnie returned to the Saturday night prime-time schedule. The changes did not help. Both shows were canceled at the end of the 1971–1972 season.

Cast
Herschel Bernardi as Arnie Nuvo
Stephanie Steele as Andrea Nuvo
Del Russel as Richard Nuvo
Sue Ane Langdon as Lilian Nuvo 
Roger Bowen as Hamilton Majors, Jr.

Episodes

Season 1: 1970–71

Season 2: 1971–72

References

External links

 
 

1970 American television series debuts
1972 American television series endings
1970s American sitcoms
1970s American workplace comedy television series
CBS original programming
English-language television shows
Television series about families
Television series by 20th Century Fox Television
Television shows set in Los Angeles